In computing on Microsoft platforms, WoW64 (Windows 32-bit on Windows 64-bit) is a subsystem of the Windows operating system capable of running 32-bit applications on 64-bit Windows. It is included in all 64-bit versions of Windows—including Windows XP Professional x64 Edition, IA-64 and x64 versions of Windows Server 2003, as well as x64 versions of Windows Vista, Windows Server 2008, Windows 7, Windows 8, Windows Server 2012, Windows 8.1, Windows 10, Windows Server 2016, Windows Server 2019, and Windows 11, as well as ARM64 versions of Windows 10, Windows 11 and Windows Server 2022, except in Windows Server Server Core where it is an optional component, and Windows Nano Server where it is not included. WoW64 aims to take care of many of the differences between 32-bit Windows and 64-bit Windows, particularly involving structural changes to Windows itself.

Translation libraries
The WoW64 subsystem comprises a lightweight compatibility layer that has similar interfaces on all 64-bit versions of Windows. It aims to create a 32-bit environment that provides the interfaces required to run unmodified 32-bit Windows applications  on a 64-bit system. WOW64 is implemented using several DLLs, some of which include: 
 Wow64.dll, the core interface to the Windows NT kernel that translates (thunks) between 32-bit and 64-bit calls, including pointer and call stack manipulations
 Wow64win.dll, which provides the appropriate entry-points for 32-bit applications (win32k thunks)
 Wow64cpu.dll, which takes care of switching the processor from 32-bit to 64-bit mode. This is used in x86-64 implementations of Windows only.

Other DLLs and binaries are included for Itanium and ARMv8 64-bit architectures to provide emulation to x86 or for 32-bit entry points if the architecture has a native 32-bit operating mode.

Architectures
Despite its outwardly similar appearance on all versions of 64-bit Windows, WoW64's implementation varies depending on the target instruction set architecture. For example, the version of 64-bit Windows developed for the Intel Itanium 2 processor (known as the IA-64 architecture) uses Wow64win.dll to set up the emulation of x86 instructions within the Itanium 2's unique instruction set. This emulation is a much more computationally expensive task than the Wow64win.dll's functions on the x86-64 architecture, which switches the processor hardware from its 64-bit mode to compatibility mode when it becomes necessary to execute a 32-bit thread, and then handles the switch back to 64-bit mode.

Registry and file system
The WoW64 subsystem also handles other key aspects of running 32-bit applications. It is involved in managing the interaction of 32-bit applications with the Windows components such as the Registry, which has distinct keys for 64-bit and 32-bit applications. For example, HKEY_LOCAL_MACHINE\Software\Wow6432Node is the 32-bit equivalent of HKEY_LOCAL_MACHINE\Software (although 32-bit applications are not aware of this redirection). Some Registry keys are mapped from 64-bit to their 32-bit equivalents, while others have their contents mirrored, depending on the edition of Windows.

The operating system uses the %SystemRoot%\system32 directory for its 64-bit library and executable files. This is done for backward compatibility reasons, as many legacy applications are hardcoded to use that path. When executing 32-bit applications, WoW64 transparently redirects 32-bit DLLs to %SystemRoot%\SysWoW64, which contains 32-bit libraries and executables. Exceptions from these redirects are
   %SystemRoot%\system32\catroot
   %SystemRoot%\system32\catroot2
   %SystemRoot%\system32\driverstore (redirected only for Windows Server 2008, Windows Vista, Windows Server 2003 and Windows XP)
   %SystemRoot%\system32\drivers\etc
   %SystemRoot%\system32\logfiles
   %SystemRoot%\system32\spool 
32-bit applications are generally not aware that they are running on a 64-bit operating system. 32-bit applications can access %SystemRoot%\System32 through the pseudo directory %SystemRoot%\sysnative.

There are two Program Files directories each visible to both 32-bit and 64-bit applications.  The directory that stores the 32 bit files is called Program Files (x86) to differentiate between the two, while the 64 bit maintains the traditional Program Files name without any additional qualifier.

Application compatibility
32-bit applications that include only 32-bit kernel-mode device drivers, or that plug into the process space of components that are implemented purely as 64-bit processes (e.g. Windows Explorer) cannot be executed on a 64-bit platform.

32-bit service applications are supported. The SysWOW64 folder located in the Windows folder on the OS drive contains several applications to support 32-bit applications (e.g. cmd.exe, odbcad32.exe, to register ODBC connections for 32-bit applications). 16-bit legacy applications for MS-DOS and early versions of Windows are usually incompatible with 64-bit versions of Windows Vista, 7, 8, and 10, but can be run on a 64-bit Windows OS via virtualization software. 32-bit versions of Windows XP, Vista, 7, 8, and 10 on the other hand, can usually run 16-bit applications with few to no problems. 16-bit applications cannot be directly run under x64 editions of Windows, because the CPU does not support VM86 mode when running in x64.

Internet Explorer is implemented as both a 32-bit and a 64-bit application because of the large number of 32-bit ActiveX components on the Internet that would not be able to plug into the 64-bit version.

Previously, the 32-bit version was used by-default and it was difficult to set the 64-bit version to be the default browser.  This changed in Internet Explorer 10, which ran 32-bit add-ons inside a 64-bit session, eliminating the need to switch between the two versions.  If a user was to go into the 32-bit folder (typically C:\Program Files (x86)\Internet Explorer) and double-click the iexplore.exe file there, the 64-bit version will still load.  In Internet Explorer 9 and previous, this would load only the 32-bit version.

, a bug in the translation layer of the x64 version of WoW64 also renders all 32-bit applications that rely on the Windows API function GetThreadContext incompatible. Such applications include application debuggers, call stack tracers (e.g. IDEs displaying call stack) and applications that use garbage collection (GC) engines. One of the more widely used but affected GC engines is the Boehm GC. It is also used as the default garbage collector of the equally popular Mono. While Mono has introduced a new (but optional) GC as of October 2010 called SGen-GC, it performs stack scanning in the same manner as Boehm GC, thus also making it incompatible under WoW64. No fix has been provided as of July 2016, although workarounds have been suggested.

Performance

According to Microsoft, 32-bit software running under WOW64 has similar performance to executing under 32-bit Windows, but with fewer threads possible and other overheads.

A 32-bit application can be given a full 4 gigabytes of virtual memory on a 64-bit system, whereas on a 32-bit system, some of this addressable memory is lost because it is used by the kernel and memory-mapped peripherals such as the display adaptor, typically resulting in apps being able to use either 2GB or 3GB of RAM at most.

See also
 Shim (computing)
 User Account Control also has a mechanism for dealing with "older" programs that write files to specific areas, on "newer" windows.  Files written from a process without administrator privileges to protected locations, such as Program Files and windows\system32, will be redirected to a virtual store directory.
Windows on Windows

References

External links
MSDN page on running 32 bit apps on 64 bit Windows

Windows NT architecture
Compatibility layers
2001 software